Diana Enache (born 12 December 1987; formerly known as Diana Buzean) is a Romanian former tennis player.

In her career, she won 13 singles and 49 doubles titles on the ITF Women's Circuit. On 11 April 2011, she reached her best singles ranking of world No. 343. On 2 November 2015, she peaked at No. 213 in the doubles rankings.

Enache made her WTA Tour debut at the 2015 BRD Bucharest Open, partnering Chantal Škamlová in the doubles draw. They lost their first-round match against Çağla Büyükakçay and Viktorija Golubic.

Personal life
In June 2012, Diana married footballer Ionuț Buzean.

In September 2016, she reverted to being called Enache.

ITF Circuit finals

Singles: 31 (13 titles, 18 runner-ups)

Doubles: 80 (49 titles, 31 runner-ups)

References

External links

 
 

1987 births
Living people
Sportspeople from Pitești
Romanian female tennis players